The  has a history that spans more than 100 years. Japan has one of the oldest and largest film industries in the world; as of 2021, it was the fourth largest by number of feature films produced. In 2011 Japan produced 411 feature films that earned 54.9% of a box office total of US$2.338 billion. Films have been produced in Japan since 1897, when the first foreign cameramen arrived.

Tokyo Story (1953) ranked number three in Sight & Sound critics' list of the 100 greatest films of all time. Tokyo Story also topped the 2012 Sight & Sound directors' poll of The Top 50 Greatest Films of All Time, dethroning Citizen Kane, while Akira Kurosawa's Seven Samurai (1954) was voted the greatest foreign-language film of all time in BBC's 2018 poll of 209 critics in 43 countries. Japan has won the Academy Award for the Best International Feature Film five times, more than any other Asian country.

Japan's Big Four film studios are Toho, Toei, Shochiku and Kadokawa, which are the only members of the Motion Picture Producers Association of Japan (MPPAJ). The annual Japan Academy Film Prize hosted by the Nippon Academy-shō Association is considered to be the Japanese equivalent of the Academy Awards.

History

Early silent era

The kinetoscope, first shown commercially by Thomas Edison in the United States in 1894, was first shown in Japan in November 1896. The Vitascope and the Lumière Brothers' Cinematograph were first presented in Japan in early 1897, by businessmen such as Inabata Katsutaro. Lumière cameramen were the first to shoot films in Japan. Moving pictures, however, were not an entirely new experience for the Japanese because of their rich tradition of pre-cinematic devices such as gentō (utsushi-e) or the magic lantern. The first successful Japanese film in late 1897 showed sights in Tokyo.

In 1898 some ghost films were made, such as the Shirō Asano shorts Bake Jizo (Jizo the Spook / 化け地蔵) and Shinin no sosei (Resurrection of a Corpse). The first documentary, the short Geisha no teodori (芸者の手踊り), was made in June 1899. Tsunekichi Shibata made a number of early films, including Momijigari, an 1899 record of two famous actors performing a scene from a well-known kabuki play. Early films were influenced by traditional theater – for example, kabuki and bunraku.

20th century
At the dawn of the 20th century theaters in Japan hired benshi, storytellers who sat next to the screen and narrated silent movies. They were descendants of kabuki jōruri, kōdan storytellers, theater barkers and other forms of oral storytelling. Benshi could be accompanied by music like silent films from cinema of the West. With the advent of sound in the early 1930s, the benshi gradually declined.

In 1908, Shōzō Makino, considered the pioneering director of Japanese film, began his influential career with Honnōji gassen (本能寺合戦), produced for Yokota Shōkai. Shōzō recruited Matsunosuke Onoe, a former kabuki actor, to star in his productions. Onoe became Japan's first film star, appearing in over 1,000 films, mostly shorts, between 1909 and 1926. The pair pioneered the jidaigeki genre. Tokihiko Okada was a popular romantic lead of the same era.

The first Japanese film production studio was built in 1909 by the Yoshizawa Shōten company in Tokyo.

The first female Japanese performer to appear in a film professionally was the dancer/actress Tokuko Nagai Takagi, who appeared in four shorts for the American-based Thanhouser Company between 1911 and 1914.

Among intellectuals, critiques of Japanese cinema grew in the 1910s and eventually developed into a movement that transformed Japanese film. Film criticism began with early film magazines such as Katsudō shashinkai (begun in 1909) and a full-length book written by Yasunosuke Gonda in 1914, but many early film critics often focused on chastising the work of studios like Nikkatsu and Tenkatsu for being too theatrical (using, for instance, elements from kabuki and shinpa such as onnagata) and for not utilizing what were considered more cinematic techniques to tell stories, instead relying on benshi. In what was later named the Pure Film Movement, writers in magazines such as Kinema Record called for a broader use of such cinematic techniques. Some of these critics, such as Norimasa Kaeriyama, went on to put their ideas into practice by directing such films as The Glow of Life (1918), which was one of the first films to use actresses (in this case, Harumi Hanayagi). There were parallel efforts elsewhere in the film industry. In his 1917 film The Captain's Daughter, Masao Inoue started using techniques new to the silent film era, such as the close-up and cut back. The Pure Film Movement was central in the development of the gendaigeki and scriptwriting.

New studios established around 1920, such as Shochiku and Taikatsu, aided the cause for reform. At Taikatsu, Thomas Kurihara directed films scripted by the novelist Junichiro Tanizaki, who was a strong advocate of film reform. Even Nikkatsu produced reformist films under the direction of Eizō Tanaka. By the mid-1920s, actresses had replaced onnagata and films used more of the devices pioneered by Inoue. Some of the most discussed silent films from Japan are those of Kenji Mizoguchi, whose later works (including Ugetsu/Ugetsu Monogatari) retain a very high reputation.

Japanese films gained popularity in the mid-1920s against foreign films, in part fueled by the popularity of movie stars and a new style of jidaigeki. Directors such as Daisuke Itō and Masahiro Makino made samurai films like A Diary of Chuji's Travels and Roningai featuring rebellious antiheroes in fast-cut fight scenes that were both critically acclaimed and commercial successes. Some stars, such as Tsumasaburo Bando, Kanjūrō Arashi, Chiezō Kataoka, Takako Irie and Utaemon Ichikawa, were inspired by Makino Film Productions and formed their own independent production companies where directors such as Hiroshi Inagaki, Mansaku Itami and Sadao Yamanaka honed their skills. Director Teinosuke Kinugasa created a production company to produce the experimental masterpiece A Page of Madness, starring Masao Inoue, in 1926. Many of these companies, while surviving during the silent era against major studios like Nikkatsu, Shochiku, Teikine, and Toa Studios, could not survive the cost involved in converting to sound.

With the rise of left-wing political movements and labor unions at the end of the 1920s, there arose so-called tendency films with left-leaning tendencies. Directors Kenji Mizoguchi, Daisuke Itō, Shigeyoshi Suzuki, and Tomu Uchida were prominent examples. In contrast to these commercially produced 35 mm films, the Marxist Proletarian Film League of Japan (Prokino) made works independently in smaller gauges (such as 9.5mm and 16mm), with more radical intentions. Tendency films suffered from severe censorship heading into the 1930s, and Prokino members were arrested and the movement effectively crushed. Such moves by the government had profound effects on the expression of political dissent in 1930s cinema. Films from this period include: Sakanaya Honda, Jitsuroku Chushingura, Horaijima, Orochi, Maboroshi, Kurutta Ippeji, Jujiro, Kurama Tengu: Kyōfu Jidai, and Kurama Tengu.

A later version of The Captain's Daughter was one of the first talkie films. It used the Mina Talkie System. The Japanese film industry later split into two groups; one retained the Mina Talkie System, while the other used the Eastphone Talkie System used to make Tojo Masaki's films.

The 1923 earthquake, the bombing of Tokyo during World War II, and the natural effects of time and Japan's humidity on flammable and unstable nitrate film have resulted in a great dearth of surviving films from this period.

Unlike in the West, silent films were still being produced in Japan well into the 1930s; as late as 1938, a third of Japanese films were silent. For instance, Yasujirō Ozu's An Inn in Tokyo (1935), considered a precursor to the neorealism genre, was a silent film. A few Japanese sound shorts were made in the 1920s and 1930s, but Japan's first feature-length talkie was Fujiwara Yoshie no furusato (1930), which used the Mina Talkie System. Notable talkies of this period include Mikio Naruse's Wife, Be Like A Rose! (Tsuma Yo Bara No Yoni, 1935), which was one of the first Japanese films to gain a theatrical release in the U.S.; Kenji Mizoguchi's Sisters of the Gion (Gion no shimai, 1936); Osaka Elegy (1936); The Story of the Last Chrysanthemums (1939); and Sadao Yamanaka's Humanity and Paper Balloons (1937).

Film criticism shared this vitality, with many film journals such as Kinema Junpo and newspapers printing detailed discussions of the cinema of the day, both at home and abroad. A cultured "impressionist" criticism pursued by critics such as Tadashi Iijima, Fuyuhiko Kitagawa, and Matsuo Kishi was dominant, but opposed by leftist critics such as Akira Iwasaki and Genjū Sasa who sought an ideological critique of films.

The 1930s also saw increased government involvement in cinema, which was symbolized by the passing of the Film Law, which gave the state more authority over the film industry, in 1939. The government encouraged some forms of cinema, producing propaganda films and promoting documentary films (also called bunka eiga or "culture films"), with important documentaries being made by directors such as Fumio Kamei. Realism was in favor; film theorists such as Taihei Imamura and Heiichi Sugiyama advocated for documentary or realist drama, while directors such as Hiroshi Shimizu and Tomotaka Tasaka produced fiction films that were strongly realistic in style. Films reinforced the importance of traditional Japanese values against the rise of the Westernised modern girl, a character epitomised by Shizue Tatsuta in Ozu's 1930 film Young Lady.

Wartime movies

Because of World War II and the weak economy, unemployment became widespread in Japan, and the cinema industry suffered.

During this period, when Japan was expanding its Empire, the Japanese government saw cinema as a propaganda tool to show the glory and invincibility of the Empire of Japan. Thus, many films from this period depict patriotic and militaristic themes. In 1942 Kajiro Yamamoto's film Hawai Mare oki kaisen or "The War at Sea from Hawaii to Malaya" portrayed the attack on Pearl Harbor; the film made use of special effects directed by Eiji Tsuburaya, including a miniature scale model of Pearl Harbor itself.

Yoshiko Yamaguchi was a very popular actress. She rose to international stardom with 22 wartime movies. The Manchukuo Film Association let her use the Chinese name Li Xianglan so she could represent Chinese roles in Japanese propaganda movies. After the war she used her official Japanese name and starred in an additional 29 movies. She was elected as a member of the Japanese parliament in the 1970s and served for 18 years.

Akira Kurosawa made his feature film debut with Sugata Sanshiro in 1943.

American occupation and Post-war period

In 1945, Japan was defeated in World War II, the rule of Japan by the SCAP (Supreme Commander for the Allied Powers) began. Movies produced in Japan were managed by GHQ's subordinate organization CIE (Civil Information Educational Section, 民間情報教育局). This management system lasted until 1952, and it was the first time in the Japanese movie world that management and control by a foreign institution was implemented. During the planning and scripting stages it was translated to English, only the movies approved by the CIE were produced. For example, Akira Kurosawa's “Akatsuki no Dassō” (1950) was originally a work depicting a Korean military comfort woman starring Yoshiko Yamaguchi, but with dozens of CIE censorship, it became an original work. The completed film was censored a second time by a CCD (Civil Censorship Detachment). The censorship was also carried out retroactively to past movie works. Japan was exposed to over a decade's worth of American animation that were banned under the war-time government.

Furthermore, as part of the occupation policy, the issue of responsibility for war spread to the film industry, and when voices of banning war cooperators in movie production during the war began to be expressed, Nagamasa Kawakita, Kanichi Negishi, Shiro Kido in 1947, the person who was involved in such high-motion films was exiled. However, as in other genre pursuits, the position of responsibility for war has been dealt with vaguely in the film industry, and the above measures were lifted in 1950.

The first movie released after the war was “Soyokaze” (そよかぜ) 1945 by Yasushi Sasaki, and the theme song “Ringo no Uta” by Michiko Namiki was a big hit.

In the production ban list promulgated in 1945 by CIE's David Conde, nationalism, patriotism, suicide and slaughter, brutal violent movies, etc. became prohibited items, making the production of historical drama virtually impossible . As a result, actors who have been using historical drama as their business appeared in contemporary drama. This includes Chiezō Kataoka's “Bannai Tarao” (1946), Tsumasaburō Bandō's “Torn Drum (破れ太鼓)” (1949), Hiroshi Inagaki's “The Child Holding Hands (手をつなぐ子等)”, and Daisuke Itō's “King (王将)”.

In addition, many propaganda films were produced as democratic courtesy works recommended by SCAP. Significant movies among them are, Setsuko Hara appeared in Akira Kurosawa's “No Regrets for Our Youth” (1946), Kōzaburō Yoshimura's “A Ball at the Anjo House” (1947), Tadashi Imai's “Aoi sanmyaku” (1949), etc. It gained national popularity as a star symbolizing the beginning of a new era. In Yasushi Sasaki's "Hatachi no Seishun (はたちの青春)" (1946), the first kiss scene of a Japanese movie was filmed.

The first collaborations between Akira Kurosawa and actor Toshiro Mifune were Drunken Angel in 1948 and Stray Dog in 1949. Yasujirō Ozu directed the critically and commercially successful Late Spring in 1949.

The Mainichi Film Award was created in 1946.

The 1950s are widely considered the Golden Age of Japanese cinema. Three Japanese films from this decade (Rashomon, Seven Samurai and Tokyo Story) appeared in the top ten of Sight & Sounds critics' and directors' polls for the best films of all time in 2002. They also appeared in the 2012 polls, with Tokyo Story (1953) dethroning Citizen Kane at the top of the 2012 directors' poll.

War movies restricted by SCAP began to be produced, Hideo Sekigawa's “Listen to the Voices of the Sea” (1950), Tadashi Imai's “Himeyuri no Tô - Tower of the Lilies” (1953), Keisuke Kinoshita's “Twenty-Four Eyes” (1954), “ Kon Ichikawa's “The Burmese Harp” (1956), and other works aimed at the tragic and sentimental retrospective of the war experience, one after another, It became a social influence. Other Nostalgia films such as Battleship Yamato (1953) and Eagle of the Pacific (1953) were also mass-produced. Under these circumstances, movies such as "Emperor Meiji and the Russo-Japanese War (明治天皇と日露大戦争)" (1957), where Kanjūrō Arashi played Emperor Meiji, also appeared. It was a situation that was unthinkable before the war, the commercialization of the Emperor who was supposed to be sacred and inviolable.

The period after the American Occupation led to a rise in diversity in movie distribution thanks to the increased output and popularity of the film studios of Toho, Daiei, Shochiku, Nikkatsu, and Toei. This period gave rise to the four great artists of Japanese cinema: Masaki Kobayashi, Akira Kurosawa, Kenji Mizoguchi, and Yasujirō Ozu. Each director dealt with the effects the war and subsequent occupation by America in unique and innovative ways.

The decade started with Akira Kurosawa's Rashomon (1950), which won the Golden Lion at the Venice Film Festival in 1951 and the Academy Honorary Award for Best Foreign Language Film in 1952, and marked the entrance of Japanese cinema onto the world stage. It was also the breakout role for legendary star Toshiro Mifune. In 1953 Entotsu no mieru basho by Heinosuke Gosho was in competition at the 3rd Berlin International Film Festival.

The first Japanese film in color was Carmen Comes Home directed by Keisuke Kinoshita and released in 1951. There was also a black-and-white version of this film available. Tokyo File 212 (1951) was the first American feature film to be shot entirely in Japan. The lead roles were played by Florence Marly and Robert Peyton. It featured the geisha Ichimaru in a short cameo. Suzuki Ikuzo's Tonichi Enterprises Company co-produced the film. Gate of Hell, a 1953 film by Teinosuke Kinugasa, was the first movie that filmed using Eastmancolor film, Gate of Hell was both Daiei's first color film and the first Japanese color movie to be released outside Japan, receiving an Academy Honorary Award in 1954 for Best Costume Design by Sanzo Wada and an Honorary Award for Best Foreign Language Film. It also won the Palme d'Or at the Cannes Film Festival, the first Japanese film to achieve that honour.

The year 1954 saw two of Japan's most influential films released. The first was the Kurosawa epic Seven Samurai, about a band of hired samurai who protect a helpless village from a rapacious gang of thieves. The same year, Kurosawa's friend and college Ishirō Honda directed the anti-nuclear monster-drama Godzilla, featuring award-winning effects by Eiji Tsuburaya. The latter film was first ever Japanese film to be given a wide release throughout the United States, where it was heavily re-edited, and featured new footage with actor Raymond Burr for its distribution in 1956 as Godzilla, King of the Monsters!. Although it was edited for its Western release, Godzilla became an international icon of Japan and spawned an entire subgenre of kaiju films, as well as the longest-running film franchise in history. Also in 1954, another Kurosawa film, Ikiru was in competition at the 4th Berlin International Film Festival.

In 1955, Hiroshi Inagaki won an Academy Honorary Award for Best Foreign Language Film for Part I of his Samurai trilogy and in 1958 won the Golden Lion at the Venice Film Festival for Rickshaw Man. Kon Ichikawa directed two anti-war dramas: The Burmese Harp (1956), which was nominated for Best Foreign Language Film at the Academy Awards, and Fires On The Plain (1959), along with Enjo (1958), which was adapted from Yukio Mishima's novel Temple Of The Golden Pavilion. Masaki Kobayashi made three films which would collectively become known as The Human Condition Trilogy: No Greater Love (1959), and The Road To Eternity (1959). The trilogy was completed in 1961, with A Soldier's Prayer.

Kenji Mizoguchi, who died in 1956, ended his career with a series of masterpieces including The Life of Oharu (1952), Ugetsu (1953) and Sansho the Bailiff (1954). He won the Silver Bear at the Venice Film Festival for Ugetsu. Mizoguchi's films often deal with the tragedies inflicted on women by Japanese society. Mikio Naruse made Repast (1950), Late Chrysanthemums (1954), The Sound of the Mountain (1954) and Floating Clouds (1955). Yasujirō Ozu began directing color films beginning with Equinox Flower (1958), and later Good Morning (1959) and Floating Weeds (1958), which was adapted from his earlier silent A Story of Floating Weeds (1934), and was shot by Rashomon and Sansho the Bailiff cinematographer Kazuo Miyagawa.

The Blue Ribbon Awards were established in 1950. The first winner for Best Film was Until We Meet Again by Tadashi Imai.

The number of films produced, and the cinema audience reached a peak in the 1960s. Most films were shown in double bills, with one half of the bill being a "program picture" or B-movie. A typical program picture was shot in four weeks. The demand for these program pictures in quantity meant the growth of film series such as The Hoodlum Soldier or Akumyo.

The huge level of activity of 1960s Japanese cinema also resulted in many classics. Akira Kurosawa directed the 1961 classic Yojimbo. Yasujirō Ozu made his final film, An Autumn Afternoon, in 1962. Mikio Naruse directed the wide screen melodrama When a Woman Ascends the Stairs in 1960; his final film was 1967's Scattered Clouds.

Kon Ichikawa captured the watershed 1964 Olympics in his three-hour documentary Tokyo Olympiad (1965). Seijun Suzuki was fired by Nikkatsu for "making films that don't make any sense and don't make any money" after his surrealist yakuza flick Branded to Kill (1967).

The 1960s were the peak years of the Japanese New Wave movement, which began in the 1950s and continued through the early 1970s. Nagisa Oshima, Kaneto Shindo, Masahiro Shinoda, Susumu Hani and Shohei Imamura emerged as major filmmakers during the decade. Oshima's Cruel Story of Youth, Night and Fog in Japan and Death By Hanging, along with Shindo's Onibaba, Hani's Kanojo to kare and Imamura's The Insect Woman, became some of the better-known examples of Japanese New Wave filmmaking. Documentary played a crucial role in the New Wave, as directors such as Hani, Kazuo Kuroki, Toshio Matsumoto, and Hiroshi Teshigahara moved from documentary into fiction film, while feature filmmakers like Oshima and Imamura also made documentaries. Shinsuke Ogawa and Noriaki Tsuchimoto became the most important documentarists: "two figures [that] tower over the landscape of Japanese documentary."

Teshigahara's Woman in the Dunes (1964) won the Special Jury Prize at the Cannes Film Festival, and was nominated for Best Director and Best Foreign Language Film Oscars. Masaki Kobayashi's Kwaidan (1965) also picked up the Special Jury Prize at Cannes and received a nomination for Best Foreign Language Film at the Academy Awards. Bushido, Samurai Saga by Tadashi Imai won the Golden Bear at the 13th Berlin International Film Festival. Immortal Love by Keisuke Kinoshita and Twin Sisters of Kyoto and Portrait of Chieko, both by Noboru Nakamura, also received nominations for Best Foreign Language Film at the Academy Awards. Lost Spring, also by Nakamura, was in competition for the Golden Bear at the 17th Berlin International Film Festival.

The 1970s saw the cinema audience drop due to the spread of television. Total audience declined from 1.2 billion in 1960 to 0.2 billion in 1980.
Film companies fought back in various ways, such as the bigger budget films of Kadokawa Pictures, or including increasingly sexual or violent content and language which could not be shown on television. The resulting pink film industry became the stepping stone for many young independent filmmakers. The seventies also saw the start of the "idol eiga", films starring young "idols", who would bring in audiences due to their fame and popularity.

Toshiya Fujita made the revenge film Lady Snowblood in 1973. In the same year, Yoshishige Yoshida made the film Coup d'État, a portrait of Ikki Kita, the leader of the Japanese coup of February 1936. Its experimental cinematography and mise-en-scène, as well as its avant-garde score by Toshi Ichiyanagi, garnered it wide critical acclaim within Japan.

In 1976, the Hochi Film Award was created. The first winner for Best Film was The Inugamis by Kon Ichikawa. Nagisa Oshima directed In the Realm of the Senses (1976), a film detailing a crime of passion involving Sada Abe set in the 1930s. Controversial for its explicit sexual content, it has never been seen uncensored in Japan.

Kinji Fukasaku completed the epic Battles Without Honor and Humanity series of yakuza films. Yoji Yamada introduced the commercially successful Tora-San series, while also directing other films, notably the popular The Yellow Handkerchief, which won the first Japan Academy Prize for Best Film in 1978. New wave filmmakers Susumu Hani and Shōhei Imamura retreated to documentary work, though Imamura made a dramatic return to feature filmmaking with Vengeance Is Mine (1979).

Dodes'ka-den by Akira Kurosawa and Sandakan No. 8 by Kei Kumai were nominated to the Academy Award for Best Foreign Language Film.

The 1980s saw the decline of the major Japanese film studios and their associated chains of cinemas, with major studios Toho and Toei barely staying in business, Shochiku supported almost solely by the Otoko wa tsurai yo films, and Nikkatsu declining even further.

Of the older generation of directors, Akira Kurosawa directed Kagemusha (1980), which won the Palme d'Or at the 1980 Cannes Film Festival, and Ran (1985). Seijun Suzuki made a comeback beginning with Zigeunerweisen in 1980. Shohei Imamura won the Palme d'Or at the Cannes Film Festival for The Ballad of Narayama (1983). Yoshishige Yoshida made A Promise (1986), his first film since 1973's Coup d'État.

New directors who appeared in the 1980s include actor Juzo Itami, who directed his first film, The Funeral, in 1984, and achieved critical and box office success with Tampopo in 1985. Shinji Sōmai, an artistically inclined populist director who made films like the youth-focused Typhoon Club, and the critically acclaimed Roman porno Love Hotel among others. Kiyoshi Kurosawa, who would generate international attention beginning in the mid-1990s, made his initial debut with pink films and genre horror.

During the 1980s, anime rose in popularity, with new animated movies released every summer and winter, often based upon popular anime television series. Mamoru Oshii released his landmark Angel's Egg in 1985. Hayao Miyazaki adapted his manga series Nausicaä of the Valley of Wind into a feature film of the same name in 1984. Katsuhiro Otomo followed suit by adapting his own manga Akira into a feature film of the same name in 1988.

Home video made possible the creation of a direct-to-video film industry.

Mini theaters, a type of independent movie theater characterized by a smaller size and seating capacity in comparison to larger movie theaters, gained popularity during the 1980s. Mini theaters helped bring independent and arthouse films from other countries, as well as films produced in Japan by unknown Japanese filmmakers, to Japanese audiences.

Heisei period
Because of economic recessions, the number of movie theaters in Japan had been steadily decreasing since the 1960s. The 1990s saw the reversal of this trend and the introduction of the multiplex in Japan. At the same time, the popularity of mini theaters continued.

Takeshi Kitano emerged as a significant filmmaker with works such as Sonatine (1993), Kids Return (1996) and Hana-bi (1997), which was given the Golden Lion at the Venice Film Festival. Shōhei Imamura again won the Golden Palm (shared with Iranian director Abbas Kiarostami), this time for The Eel (1997). He became the fifth two-time recipient, joining Alf Sjöberg, Francis Ford Coppola, Emir Kusturica and Bille August.

Kiyoshi Kurosawa gained international recognition following the release of Cure (1997). Takashi Miike launched a prolific career with titles such as Audition (1999), Dead or Alive (1999) and The Bird People in China (1998). Former documentary filmmaker Hirokazu Koreeda launched an acclaimed feature career with Maborosi (1996) and After Life (1999).

Hayao Miyazaki directed two mammoth box office and critical successes, Porco Rosso (1992) – which beat E.T. the Extra-Terrestrial (1982) as the highest-grossing film in Japan – and Princess Mononoke (1997), which also claimed the top box office spot until Titanic (1997).

Several new anime directors rose to widespread recognition, bringing with them notions of anime as not only entertainment, but modern art. Mamoru Oshii released the internationally acclaimed philosophical science fiction action film Ghost in the Shell in 1996. Satoshi Kon directed the award-winning psychological thriller Perfect Blue. Hideaki Anno also gained considerable recognition with The End of Evangelion in 1997.

In the beginning of 21st century, Japan has been referenced numerous times in popular culture, which was a relatively successful one for Japanese film industry. The country has appeared as a setting and topic multiple times in film, poetry, television, and music. The number of films being shown in Japan steadily increased, with about 821 films released in 2006. Films based on Japanese television series were especially popular during this period. Anime films now accounted for 60 percent of Japanese film production. The 1990s and 2000s are considered to be "Japanese Cinema's Second Golden Age", due to the immense popularity of anime, both within Japan and overseas.

Although not a commercial success, All About Lily Chou-Chou directed by Shunji Iwai was honored at the Berlin, the Yokohama and the Shanghai Film Festivals in 2001. Takeshi Kitano appeared in Battle Royale and directed and starred in Dolls and Zatoichi. Several horror films, Kairo, Dark Water, Yogen, the Grudge series and One Missed Call met with commercial success. In 2004, Godzilla: Final Wars, directed by Ryuhei Kitamura, was released to celebrate the 50th anniversary of Godzilla. In 2005, director Seijun Suzuki made his 56th film, Princess Raccoon. Hirokazu Koreeda claimed film festival awards around the world with two of his films Distance and Nobody Knows. Female film director Naomi Kawase's film The Mourning Forest won the Grand Prix at the Cannes Film Festival in 2007. Yoji Yamada, director of the Otoko wa Tsurai yo series, made a trilogy of acclaimed revisionist samurai films, 2002's Twilight Samurai, followed by The Hidden Blade in 2004 and Love and Honor in 2006. In 2008, Departures won the Academy Award for best foreign language film.

In anime, Hayao Miyazaki directed Spirited Away in 2001, breaking Japanese box office records and winning several awards—including the Academy Award for Best Animated Feature in 2003—followed by Howl's Moving Castle and Ponyo in 2004 and 2008 respectively. In 2004, Mamoru Oshii released the anime movie Ghost in the Shell 2: Innocence which received critical praise around the world. His 2008 film The Sky Crawlers was met with similarly positive international reception. Satoshi Kon also released three quieter, but nonetheless highly successful films: Millennium Actress, Tokyo Godfathers, and Paprika. Katsuhiro Otomo released Steamboy, his first animated project since the 1995 short film compilation Memories, in 2004. In collaboration with Studio 4C, American director Michael Arias released Tekkon Kinkreet in 2008, to international acclaim. After several years of directing primarily lower-key live-action films, Hideaki Anno formed his own production studio and revisited his still-popular Evangelion franchise with the Rebuild of Evangelion tetralogy, a new series of films providing an alternate retelling of the original story.

Some Hollywood directors have turned to Tokyo as a backdrop for movies set in Japan. Post-war period examples include Tokyo Joe, My Geisha, Tokyo Story and the James Bond film You Only Live Twice; recent examples include Lost in Translation and The Last Samurai (both in 2003), Kill Bill: Volume 1 and 2 and The Day After Tomorrow (all in 2004), Memoirs of a Geisha (2005), The Fast and the Furious: Tokyo Drift and Babel (both in 2006), The Day the Earth Stood Still (2008), 2012 (2009), Inception (2010), Emperor (2012), Pacific Rim and The Wolverine (both in 2013), Geostorm (2017), and Avengers: Endgame (2019).

Since February 2000, the Japan Film Commission Promotion Council was established. On November 16, 2001, the Japanese Foundation for the Promotion of the Arts laws were presented to the House of Representatives. These laws were intended to promote the production of media arts, including film scenery, and stipulate that the government – on both the national and local levels – must lend aid in order to preserve film media. The laws were passed on November 30 and came into effect on December 7. In 2003, at a gathering for the Agency of Cultural Affairs, twelve policies were proposed in a written report to allow public-made films to be promoted and shown at the Film Center of the National Museum of Modern Art.

Four films have so far received international recognition by being selected to compete in major film festivals: Caterpillar by Kōji Wakamatsu was in competition for the Golden Bear at the 60th Berlin International Film Festival and won the Silver Bear for Best Actress, Outrage by Takeshi Kitano was In Competition for the Palme d'Or at the 2010 Cannes Film Festival, Himizu by Sion Sono was in competition for the Golden Lion at the 68th Venice International Film Festival.

In March 2011, Japanese film and television industry was afflicted by the Tohoku earthquake and tsunami and the subsequent Fukushima nuclear disaster, which was greatly suffered due to ongoing triple disaster. However, many Japanese studios were officially closed or reorganized to prevent the triple disaster. As of result, many of Japanese studios began to reopen and production rates have increased.

In October 2011 (after fully reopening of Japanese film and television industry), Takashi Miike's Hara-Kiri: Death of a Samurai was In Competition for the Palme d'Or at the 2012 Cannes Film Festival, the first 3D film ever to screen In Competition at Cannes. The film was co-produced by British independent producer Jeremy Thomas, who had successfully broken Japanese titles such as Nagisa Oshima's Merry Christmas, Mr Lawrence and  Taboo, Takeshi Kitano's Brother, and Miike's 13 Assassins onto the international stage as producer.

In 2018, Hirokazu Kore-eda won the Palme d'Or for his movie Shoplifters at the 71st Cannes Film Festival, a festival that also featured Ryūsuke Hamaguchi's Asako I & II in competition.

Reiwa period
The 2020 Japanese epic disaster drama film Fukushima 50, released on 6 March 2020, directed by Setsurō Wakamatsu and written by Yōichi Maekawa. The film is based on the book by Ryusho Kadota, titled On the Brink: The Inside Story of Fukushima Daiichi, and it is the first Japanese film to depict the disaster.

In early 2020, Japanese film and television industry was afflicted by COVID-19 pandemic, which was greatly suffered due to health requirements, citing gave the nation its worst day of film and television industry impacted by health crisis since the end of World War II, and also were forced to suspend filming in an effort to keep their respective cast and crews safe from the infection. From the first (of many) 'health lockdowns' until the end of September 2021, many Japanese studios were closed or reorganized to suit the legal requirements for spread prevention.

In October 2020 (after the reopening film industry), a Japanese anime film Demon Slayer: Mugen Train based on the Demon Slayer: Kimetsu no Yaiba manga series broke all box-office records in the country, becoming the highest-grossing film of all time in Japan, the highest-grossing Japanese film of all time and the highest-grossing film of 2020.

In October 2021 (As Japan ahead of "Living with COVID-19 endemic phase"), a Japanese drama-road film Drive My Car won Best Foreign Language Film at the 79th Golden Globe Awards and received the Academy Award for Best International Feature Film at the 94th Academy Awards.

Genres
 Anime: animated films
 Mecha: films featuring mecha robots
 Gendaigeki: films set in the present day, the opposite of jidaigeki
 Japanese horror: horror films
 Japanese science fiction: science fiction films
 Japanese cyberpunk: cyberpunk films
 Kaiju: monster films
 Tokusatsu: films that make heavy use of special effects, usually involving costumed superheroes
 Jidaigeki: period films set during the Edo period (1603–1868) or earlier, the opposite of gendaigeki
 Samurai cinema: films featuring swordplay, also known as chanbara (an onomatopoeia describing the sound of swords clashing)
 Ninja films: films featuring ninjas
 Pink films: softcore pornographic films
 Shomingeki: realistic films about common working people
 Tendency films: socially conscious, left-leaning films
 Yakuza films: gangster films about yakuza mobsters

Box office

Film theorists
Film scholars experts in Japanese cinema include:

 Isolde Standish, Australian and British film theorist
Javanese

See also

 Japan Academy Film Prize, hosted by the Nippon Academy-shō Association, is the Japanese equivalent of the Academy Awards.
 Japan Academy Prize
 Lists of Japanese films
 List of highest-grossing Japanese films
 Lists of highest-grossing Japanese films
 List of highest-grossing films in Japan
 List of highest-grossing non-English films
 List of Japanese actors
 List of Japanese actresses
 List of Japanese film directors
 List of Japanese films
 Cinema of the world
 History of cinema
 Genres:
 List of jidaigeki
 Samurai cinema
 Ninja
 Tokusatsu
 List of Japanese-language films
 List of Japanese movie studios
 List of Japanese submissions for the Academy Award for Best International Feature Film
 Nuberu bagu (The Japanese New Wave)
 Television in Japan
 Voice acting in Japan

Notes

References

Bibliography
 
 
 
 
 
  Available online at the Center for Japanese Studies, University of Michigan
 
 
 
 
  (review)

External links

 Chronology of Japanese Cinema by Joaquín da Silva
 Toki Akihiro & Mizuguchi Kaoru (1996) A History of Early Cinema in Kyoto, Japan (1896–1912). Cinematographe and Inabata Katsutaro.
 Kato Mikiro (1996) A History of Movie Theaters and Audiences in Postwar Kyoto, the Capital of Japanese Cinema.
 Japanese Cinema Database, maintained by the Agency for Cultural Affairs (films after 1896, in Japanese)
 Japanese Film Database, maintained by UniJapan (in English, films after 2002)
 Kinema Junpo Database, maintained by Kinema Junpo (films after 1945, in Japanese)
 National Film Center Database (films in the national archive collection, in Japanese)
 Motion Picture Producers Association of Japan (includes film database, box office statistics)
 Japanese Movie Database (in Japanese)
 JAPAN CUTS: Festival of New Japanese Film (Japan Society, New York)
 Kinema Club
 Midnight Eye
 Japanese Reference Materials for Studying Japanese Cinema at Yale University by Aaron Gerow
 Japanese Cinema to 1960 by Gregg Rickman
 Japanese Film Festival (Singapore) – An annual curated film program focusing on classic Japanese cinema and new currents, with regular guest directors and actors.